Fashion 70s is a 2005 South Korean television series starring Lee Yo-won, Kim Min-jung, Joo Jin-mo and Chun Jung-myung. It was the network's 60th Anniversary of Independence Great Project, and it aired on SBS from 23 May – 29 August 2005 on Mondays and Tuesdays at 21:55 for 28 episodes. An epic, sprawling drama, it focuses on the lives of four young people, from their childhood during the Korean War, to their careers and love lives as adults. It portrays the passion of female fashion designers who pioneered Korea's fashion industry in the 1970s.

Plot
Young Joon-hee befriends little Kang-hee, but the two girls get into trouble because of Kang-hee's poor but greedy mother. Joon-hee also makes friends with two boys, Kim Dong-young, the son of a military general and Jang Bin, the son of a fashion designer.

But when North Korean forces invade their town, both girls are separated from their parents and Joon-hee's mother is killed in an explosion. Believing his daughter to have died, Joon-hee's father adopts Kang-hee and raises her as his own daughter. Joon-hee is discovered at an orphanage by Kang-hee's mother, and is also adopted. The trauma of the events causes Joon-hee to block out her childhood memories and she grows up on a small island as Deo-mi, unaware of her true identity.

Years pass and all four of their paths cross again, with complicated, destructive results. Deo-mi dreams of becoming a fashion designer, and petty criminal Jang Bin helps her move to Seoul to chase her dream. In the process he falls in love with her, but his feelings are unrequited. Deo-mi meets Dong-young, who has become an aide to the President, and although they do not recognize each other, there is an instant attraction between them. Kang-hee (now called Joon-hee) is also working in fashion, and already in love with Dong-young, but is heartbroken when she discovers he has fallen for Deo-mi.

Deo-mi and Joon-hee first become friends, then become each other's greatest rivals like Coco Chanel and Elsa Schiaparelli. They pursue both love and ambition with their lives against the backdrop of the fashion industry and the shifting social mores of 1970s Korea.

Cast 
 Lee Yo-won as Han Deo-mi
Byun Joo-yeon as young Joon-hee
 Kim Min-jung as Go Joon-hee
Jung Min-ah as Han Kang-hee
 Joo Jin-mo as Kim Dong-young
Kim Young-chan as young Dong-young
 Chun Jung-myung as Jang Bin
Eun Won-jae as young Bin
 Lee Hye-young as Jang Bong-shil
 Song Ok-sook as Lee Yang-ja
 Hyun Young as Ha Young-kyung
 Choi Il-hwa as General Kim
 Yoo Hye-ri as Byeol-dong
 Jeon In-taek as Go Chang-hwe
 Kim Byung-choon as Bang Yook-sung
 Jo Gye-hyung as Pierre Bang
 Jang Chae-won as Oh Sang-hee
 Kim Kwang-kyu as Detective
 Kim Jun-seong
 Jung So-young
 Bae Soo-bin 
 Kim Hee-ra
 Ha Ji-won (cameo ep 3)

Ratings
Fashion 70s was the 10th highest rated Korean drama of 2005 with an average viewership rating of 24+% and a peak of 29.1%.

International broadcast
 It aired in Vietnam on VTV1 from 18 November 2005.
 It aired in Philippines on QTV11 from June 2007

See also 
List of Korean television shows
Contemporary culture of South Korea
Fashion

References

External links 
Fashion 70's official SBS website 

Fashion 70's at KoreanWiz

2005 South Korean television series debuts
2005 South Korean television series endings
Seoul Broadcasting System television dramas
Korean-language television shows
South Korean romance television series
Fashion-themed television series
Television series by Kim Jong-hak Production